Sun Le (born 17 August 1993) is a Chinese goalball player. She won a silver medal at the 2016 Summer Paralympics.

Before she played goalball in 2012, Sun Le competed in shot putting.

References

Female goalball players
1993 births
Living people
Sportspeople from Hebei
People from Qinhuangdao
Paralympic goalball players of China
Paralympic silver medalists for China
Goalball players at the 2016 Summer Paralympics
Medalists at the 2016 Summer Paralympics
Paralympic medalists in goalball
Beijing Union University alumni
21st-century Chinese women